The Pee Dee people, also Pedee and Peedee, are American Indians of the Southeast United States. Historically, their population has been concentrated in the Piedmont of present-day South Carolina. In the 17th and 18th centuries, English colonists named the Pee Dee River and the Pee Dee region of South Carolina for the tribe.

Several organizations, including state-recognized tribes, one state-recognized group and unrecognized groups, claim descent from the Pedee.

Name
The meaning of the name Pedee is unknown.

Precontact history

The Pee Dee culture is an archaeological culture spanning 1000 to 1500 CE. It is divided into the Teal phase (1000–1200), Town Creek phase (1200–1400), and Leak phase (1400–1500). The Pee Dee were part of the South Appalachian Mississippian culture that developed in the region as early as 980 CE, extending into present-day North Carolina and Tennessee. They participated in a widespread trade network that stretched from Georgia to South Carolina, eastern Tennessee, and the mountain and Piedmont regions of North Carolina.

The Pee Dee culture had developed as a distinct culture by 980 CE and thrived in the Pee Dee River region of present-day North and South Carolina during the pre-Columbian era. As an example, the Town Creek Indian Mound site in western North Carolina was occupied from about 1150 to 1400 CE.

Town Creek Indian Mound in Montgomery County, North Carolina is a proto-historic Pee Dee culture site. Extensive archeological research for 50 years since 1937 at the Town Creek Indian Mound and village site in western North Carolina near the border with South Carolina has provided insights into their culture. The mound and village site has been designated as a National Historic Landmark.

History
Around 1550, the Pedee migrated from the lower Pee Dee River of the Atlantic Coastal Plain to the upper Pee Dee River of the Piedmont and remained there for about a century. They displaced local hill tribes, such as the Saponi, who resettled the region when the Pedee left. Historian Charles M. Hudson believes their migration may have been an effort to avoid Spanish slave raids along South Carolina's coast. These 16th-century Pedee practiced head flattening, as did  the neighboring Waxhaw. In 1567, Spanish explorers encountered the village Vehidi on the Pee Dee River, believed to be a Pedee settlement.

In 1600, the population of Pedee people was estimated to be 600. Europeans, mostly from the British Isles, began settling in South Carolina in large numbers in the 17th and early 18th century. The English established a trading post at Euauenee or Saukey in 1716 to trade with the Pedee and Waccamaw. The Winyaw and Algonquian-speaking Cape Fear Indians migrated from the Atlantic Coast up the Pee Dee River to the trading post.

In 1711, the Tuscarora War broke out in North Carolina, and South Carolina tribes joined in the fighting. In 1712, Pedee warriors, along with the Saraw, Saxapahaw, Winyaw, and Cape Fear Indians, served in British Captain John Bull's company to fight alongside the British against the Tuscarora and helped defeat them. As a result, most of the Tuscarora left the area and migrated north, reaching present-day New York and Ontario to join the related Haudenosaunee Confederacy of Iroquois tribes.

In 1715, English mapmakers recorded a Pedee village on the west band of the Pee Dee River's central course.

The political relationships formed between the Pedee and other tribes in the area at this time carried over into their alliances of the Yamasee War. The Yamasee War of 1715–1717 resulted in major changes among the Southeastern tribes. Historian William James Rivers wrote in 1885 that the Pedee along with many other tribes were "utterly extirpated." However, some survivors may have found refuge with the Siouan-speaking Catawba, who were located near the South and North Carolina border.

In 1737, the Pedee tribe petitioned South Carolina for a parcel of land to live upon. They, along with their Natchez cousins were moved to a  parcel provided by James Coachman in 1738. This land was in Berkeley County, along the Edisto River.

In the 1740s, the Pedee, along with the Sara, Yuchi, Natchez, and Cape Fear Indians, were known as "settlement Indians," by South Carolinian English settlers. Anthropologists James Mooney and John R. Swanton both wrote that in 1744 the Natchez and Pedee attacked and killed several Catawba people, so the Catawba drove them into European settlements. Mooney wrote of the Pedee that, "In 1746 they and the Sara are mentioned as two small tribes, which had been long incorporated with the Catawba. They were restless under the connection, however, and again Governor Glen had to interfere to prevent their separation." Like neighboring tribes during this era, the Pedee owned African-American slaves.

In 1751, at an intertribal conference in Albany, New York, the Pedee were recorded as being a small tribe living among European colonists. In 1752, Catawba envoys encouraged the Pedee to settle with their tribe. Governor John Glen spoke to Catawba leader King Haigler on May 29, 1755, and said South Carolina had "persuaded the Charraws, Waccamaws, and some of the Pedees to join you [the Catawba]." When Cherokee killed Pedee and Waccamaw people in 1755, they were still living in European settlements. This 1755 mention was the second-to-last historical record of the Pedee people until the 20th century. 

Swanton wrote, "In 1808 White neighbors remembered when as many as 30 Pedee and Cape Fear Indians lived in their old territories," but "In 1808 the Pedee and Cape Fear tribes were represented by one half-breed woman."

Language 
The Pedee language was extinct by the 19th century. No words from the language were recorded, but linguists suspect the language belonged to the Catawban languages, or Eastern Siouan language branch of the Siouan language family. Pedee may have been a dialect of the Catawba language, which is also extinct.

State-recognized entities 
The State of South Carolina has officially acknowledged three state-recognized tribes that identify as being   Pee Dee descendants and one state-recognized group. The state-recognized tribes are:

 Pee Dee Indian Nation of Upper South Carolina, Little Rock, South Carolina (state-recognized in 2005), 532 members (2008), living primarily in Dillon and Marlboro counties;
 Pee Dee Indian Tribe of South Carolina, McColl, South Carolina (recognized in 2006).
 Beaver Creek Indians (also known as the Beaver Creek Indian Tribe), Salley, South Carolina (recognized in 2006). 

The one state-recognized group is:
 Pee Dee Indian Nation of Beaver Creek, Neeses, South Carolina (recognized in 2007).

References

Further reading

Further reading
 H. Trawick Ward and R. P. Stephen Davis Jr., Time before History: The Archaeology of North Carolina, University of North Carolina Press, 1999.
 Joffre Lanning Coe, Town Creek Indian Mound: A Native American Legacy, University of North Carolina Press, 1995.

External links
 Pee Dee Indian Tribe of South Carolina, state-recognized
 Pedee Indian Tribe, Native American Indian languages
 3-D Model of Pee Dee culture ceramic pot, Town Creek site, 1150–1400 CE, University of North Carolina, Chapel Hill

Indigenous peoples of the Southeastern Woodlands
Native American history of North Carolina
Native American history of South Carolina
Native American tribes in South Carolina
South Appalachian Mississippian culture
State-recognized tribes in the United States
Unattested languages of North America